The 1972 NHL Amateur Draft was the 10th NHL Entry Draft. It was held at the Queen Elizabeth Hotel in Montreal, Quebec.

The last active player in the NHL from this draft class was Richard Brodeur, who played his last NHL game in the 1987–88 season.

Selections by round
Below are listed the selections in the 1972 NHL amateur draft. The expansion Islanders won the first pick by a coin toss between themselves and the Flames.

Round one

 The Los Angeles Kings' first-round pick went to the Montreal Canadiens as the result of a trade on June 11, 1968, that sent Gerry Desjardins to Los Angeles in exchange for Los Angeles' 1969 first-round pick (Dick Redmond) and this pick.
 In June 1969, the Montreal Canadiens' traded the 1969 first-round pick to the Minnesota North Stars in exchange for Minnesota's promised to Montreal that they would not draft Dick Duff in the 1969 intra-league draft.
 The California Golden Seals' first-round pick went to the Montreal Canadiens as the result of a trade on June 10, 1968, that sent Bryan Watson and cash to California in exchange for future considerations (Tom Thurlby trade completed in September 1968) and this pick.
 The Minnesota North Stars' first-round pick went to the Montreal Canadiens as the result of a trade on June 10, 1968, that sent Minnesota's first-round pick in 1972, cash and future considerations (Marshall Johnston trade completed on May 25, 1971) to Montreal in exchange for Danny Grant, Claude Larose and future considerations (Bob Murdoch trade completed on May 25, 1971).
 The Pittsburgh Penguins' first-round pick went to the Minnesota North Stars as the result of a trade on October 1, 1968, that sent Pittsburgh's first-round pick in 1972 to Minnesota in exchange for Bob Woytowich.
 The Montreal Canadiens received the lowest of Minnesota's two first-round pick.
 The Detroit Red Wings' first-round pick went to the New York Rangers as the result of a trade on May 24, 1972, that sent Gary Doak and Rick Newell to Detroit in exchange for Joe Zanussi and this pick.

Round two

 The Buffalo Sabres' second-round pick went to the New York Rangers as the result of a trade on January 14, 1972, that sent Jim Lorentz to Buffalo in exchange for this pick.
 The St. Louis Blues' second-round pick went to the Buffalo Sabres as the result of a trade on March 5, 1972, that sent Chris Evans to St. Louis in exchange for George Morrison and this pick.
 The Montreal Canadiens' second-round pick went to the California Golden Seals as the result of a trade on June 8, 1972, that sent Montreal's second-round pick in 1972 to California in exchange for California's first-round and second-round picks in 1973 as settlement of waiver draft payment owed from California to Montreal for California selecting Carol Vadnais in the  1968 intra-league draft.
 Montreal previously acquired this pick as the result of a trade on May 24, 1971, that sent Montreal's first-round pick in 1972, Gary Gambucci and Bob Paradise to Minnesota in exchange for Minnesota's first-round pick in 1972, second-round pick in 1972 and cash.
 The original trade between Montreal and California was on June 12, 1968, that sent California's first-round and second-round picks in 1973 to Montreal in exchange for the opportunity to select Carol Vadnais in the 1968 intra-league draft.
 The St. Louis Blues' second-round pick went to the Pittsburgh Penguins as the result of a trade on June 6, 1969, that sent Lou Angotti and Pittsburgh's first-round pick in 1971 to St. Louis (St. Louis selected Gene Carr) in exchange for Craig Cameron, Ron Schock and this pick.

Round three

Round four

Round five

 The Atlanta Flames' fifth-round pick went to the Montreal Canadiens as the result of a trade on June 7, 1972, that sent Ted Tucker and Montreal's fifth-round pick in 1972 to Atlanta in exchange for cash and this pick. Ted Tucker and Montreal's fifth-round pick in 1973.
 The Montreal Canadiens' fifth-round pick went to the Atlanta Flames as the result of a trade on June 7, 1972, that sent the Atlanta's fifth-round pick in 1972 (Bill Nyrop) and cash to Montreal in exchange for Ted Tucker and this pick.

Round six

Round seven

 The Buffalo Sabres' seventh-round pick went to the New York Islanders as the result of a trade on June 6, 1972, that the Islanders' promised to not take certain players in the 1972 NHL Expansion Draft in exchange for Buffalo's eight-round, ninth-round, tenth-round picks in the 1972 NHL Amateur Draft and this pick.

Round eight

 The Los Angeles Kings' eighth-round pick went to the Minnesota North Stars as the result of a trade on June 8, 1972, that sent Los Angeles' tenth-round pick in the 1972 NHL Amateur Draft and this pick to Minnesota in exchange for cash.
 The Buffalo Sabres' eighth-round pick went to the New York Islanders as the result of a trade on June 6, 1972, that the Islanders' promised to not take certain players in the 1972 NHL Expansion Draft in exchange for Buffalo's seventh-round (Don McLaughlin), ninth-round, tenth-round picks in the 1972 NHL Amateur Draft and this pick.

Round nine

 The Los Angeles Kings' ninth-round pick went to the Atlanta Flames as the result of a trade on June 6, 1972, that the Flames' promised to not take certain players in the 1972 NHL Expansion Draft in exchange for Los Angeles' tenth-round pick in the 1973 NHL Amateur Draft and this pick. 
 The Buffalo Sabres' ninth-round pick went to the New York Islanders as the result of a trade on June 6, 1972, that the Islanders' promised to not take certain players in the 1972 NHL Expansion Draft in exchange for Buffalo's seventh-round (Don McLaughlin), eight-round (Rene Levasseur), tenth-round picks in the 1972 NHL Amateur Draft and this pick.
 The St. Louis Blues' ninth-round pick went to the New York Rangers as the result of a trade on June 8, 1972, that sent cash to St. Louis in exchange for this pick.
 The New York Rangers' ninth-round pick went to the Atlanta Flames as the result of a trade on June 6, 1972, that the Flames' promised to not take certain players in the 1972 NHL Expansion Draft in exchange for this pick.  The Flames passed on making a selection.
 The Boston Bruins' ninth-round pick went to the Toronto Maple Leafs as the result of a trade on June 8, 1972, that sent this pick to Toronto in exchange for cash.

Round ten

 The Los Angeles Kings' eighth-round pick went to the Minnesota North Stars as the result of a trade on June 8, 1972, that sent Los Angeles' eighth-round pick in the 1972 NHL Amateur Draft (Scott MacPhail) and this pick to Minnesota in exchange for cash.
 The Buffalo Sabres' tenth-round pick went to the New York Islanders as the result of a trade on June 6, 1972, that the Islanders' promised to not take certain players in the 1972 NHL Expansion Draft in exchange for Buffalo's seventh-round (Don McLaughlin), eight-round (Rene Levasseur), ninth-round (Bill Ennos) picks in the 1972 NHL Amateur Draft and this pick.
 The California Golden Seals' tenth-round pick went to the Minnesota North Stars as the result of a trade on June 8, 1972, that sent this pick to Minnesota in exchange for cash.
 The Philadelphia Flyers' tenth-round pick went to the Minnesota North Stars as the result of a trade on June 8, 1972, that sent this pick to Minnesota in exchange for cash.
 The Toronto Maple Leafs' tenth-round pick went to the Minnesota North Stars as the result of a trade on June 8, 1972, that sent cash to Toronto in exchange for this pick.  The North Stars passed on making a selection.

Round eleven

Draftees based on nationality

See also
 1972–73 NHL season
 1972 NHL Expansion Draft
 List of NHL players

Notes

References

External links
 HockeyDraftCentral.com
 1972 NHL Amateur Draft player stats at The Internet Hockey Database

Draft
National Hockey League Entry Draft